Cape Mary Harmsworth (Russian: Мыс Мэри-Хармсуорт; Mys Meri Kharmsuort) is a cape located in Alexandra Land (Russian Federation).

This cape is the westernmost point of the Franz Josef Archipelago proper, not counting far-lying Victoria Island which is geographically detached from the group.

Cape Mary Harmsworth was named after Alfred Harmsworth' s wife Mary. Alfred Harmsworth, fellow of the Royal Geographical Society, was the main sponsor of the 1894 Jackson-Harmsworth Polar Expedition to Franz Joseph Land.

This is the place that Russian navigator Valerian Albanov of the Svyataya Anna reached in 1914 after his long and tragic ordeal on the Polar ice.

References
Valerian Albanov, In the Land of White Death.
Jackson-Harmsworth Polar Expedition: 

Mary